Aziz Hasan (Romanized: 'Aziz Ḥasan, Hindi: अज़ीज़ हसन, Urdu: عزیز حسن) a.k.a. Mahboob Meena shah, populary Baba Ji (3 July 1934 – 18 September 2020) was an Indian Sufi Saint and social worker.

Early life 
He was born in Yahiyaganj, Lucknow. His birth name was Aziz Hasan.

He joined Indian Navy in 1944 at the age of 10 and went to Singapore during World War II.

Education 
He completed his primary education at Hussainabad Inter College, Lucknow then intermediate from H.A.I.S. Bahadur Inter college. He pursued his higher education from Muslim University.

Career 
In the year of 1967 he met to Ikram Meena shah and started his sufism life. He served his life for Madrasa Amirul Uloom Minaiya(est.1983). Later in 1998 he founded MSITM Degree College (Gonda).

He was Sajjada nashin at Darbar-e-Aliya Minaiya.

Death 
He was died on 18 September 2020.

See also 

 Sufism in India
 Barelvi

Reference 

1934 births
2020 deaths
Indian Sufi saints
Barelvi
People from Lucknow district
People from Gonda, Uttar Pradesh